The Anna Constituency (No. 89) is a Russian legislative constituency in Voronezh Oblast. It covers northwestern Voronezh Oblast and the city of Anna.

Members elected
By-election are shown in italics.

Election results

1993

|-
! colspan=2 style="background-color:#E9E9E9;text-align:left;vertical-align:top;" |Candidate
! style="background-color:#E9E9E9;text-align:left;vertical-align:top;" |Party
! style="background-color:#E9E9E9;text-align:right;" |Votes
! style="background-color:#E9E9E9;text-align:right;" |%
|-
|style="background-color:"|
|align=left|Nikolay Parinov
|align=left|Independent
|
|25.73%
|-
|style="background-color:"|
|align=left|Ruslan Gostev
|align=left|Communist Party
| -
|11.88%
|-
| colspan="5" style="background-color:#E9E9E9;"|
|- style="font-weight:bold"
| colspan="3" style="text-align:left;" | Total
| 
| 100%
|-
| colspan="5" style="background-color:#E9E9E9;"|
|- style="font-weight:bold"
| colspan="4" |Source:
|
|}

1995

|-
! colspan=2 style="background-color:#E9E9E9;text-align:left;vertical-align:top;" |Candidate
! style="background-color:#E9E9E9;text-align:left;vertical-align:top;" |Party
! style="background-color:#E9E9E9;text-align:right;" |Votes
! style="background-color:#E9E9E9;text-align:right;" |%
|-
|style="background-color:#DA2021"|
|align=left|Ivan Rybkin
|align=left|Ivan Rybkin Bloc
|
|28.32%
|-
|style="background-color:"|
|align=left|Aleksandr Polnikov
|align=left|Agrarian Party
|
|11.92%
|-
|style="background-color:"|
|align=left|Anatoly Naumov
|align=left|Independent
|
|10.48%
|-
|style="background-color:"|
|align=left|Nikolay Parinov (incumbent)
|align=left|Independent
|
|10.32%
|-
|style="background-color:"|
|align=left|Aleksandr Sterligov
|align=left|Union of Patriots
|
|8.40%
|-
|style="background-color:"|
|align=left|Sergey Kravchenko
|align=left|Liberal Democratic Party
|
|6.03%
|-
|style="background-color:"|
|align=left|Grigory Dorofeev
|align=left|Power to the People!
|
|3.02%
|-
|style="background-color:"|
|align=left|Vladimir Peshkov
|align=left|Independent
|
|2.98%
|-
|style="background-color:"|
|align=left|Aleksandr Ishkov
|align=left|Our Home – Russia
|
|2.67%
|-
|style="background-color:#F21A29"|
|align=left|Yury Shipilov
|align=left|Trade Unions and Industrialists – Union of Labour
|
|1.70%
|-
|style="background-color:"|
|align=left|Nikolay Khizhny
|align=left|Environmental Party of Russia "Kedr"
|
|1.17%
|-
|style="background-color:"|
|align=left|Nikolay Sapelkin
|align=left|Independent
|
|1.01%
|-
|style="background-color:#324194"|
|align=left|Viktor Liyaskin
|align=left|Union of Workers of ZhKKh
|
|0.92%
|-
|style="background-color:#000000"|
|colspan=2 |against all
|
|8.55%
|-
| colspan="5" style="background-color:#E9E9E9;"|
|- style="font-weight:bold"
| colspan="3" style="text-align:left;" | Total
| 
| 100%
|-
| colspan="5" style="background-color:#E9E9E9;"|
|- style="font-weight:bold"
| colspan="4" |Source:
|
|}

1997

|-
! colspan=2 style="background-color:#E9E9E9;text-align:left;vertical-align:top;" |Candidate
! style="background-color:#E9E9E9;text-align:left;vertical-align:top;" |Party
! style="background-color:#E9E9E9;text-align:right;" |Votes
! style="background-color:#E9E9E9;text-align:right;" |%
|-
|style="background-color:"|
|align=left|Dmitry Rogozin
|align=left|Independent
|-
|37.91%
|-
| colspan="5" style="background-color:#E9E9E9;"|
|- style="font-weight:bold"
| colspan="3" style="text-align:left;" | Total
| -
| 100%
|-
| colspan="5" style="background-color:#E9E9E9;"|
|- style="font-weight:bold"
| colspan="4" |Source:
|
|}

1999

|-
! colspan=2 style="background-color:#E9E9E9;text-align:left;vertical-align:top;" |Candidate
! style="background-color:#E9E9E9;text-align:left;vertical-align:top;" |Party
! style="background-color:#E9E9E9;text-align:right;" |Votes
! style="background-color:#E9E9E9;text-align:right;" |%
|-
|style="background-color:#FCCA19"|
|align=left|Dmitry Rogozin (incumbent)
|align=left|Congress of Russian Communities-Yury Boldyrev Movement
|
|32.52%
|-
|style="background-color:"|
|align=left|Sergey Rudakov
|align=left|Communist Party
|
|28.01%
|-
|style="background-color:"|
|align=left|Yury Ofitserov
|align=left|Independent
|
|12.67%
|-
|style="background-color:"|
|align=left|Vladimir Aliluev
|align=left|Independent
|
|5.78%
|-
|style="background-color:#020266"|
|align=left|Lyubov Rudikova
|align=left|Russian Socialist Party
|
|3.73%
|-
|style="background-color:#3B9EDF"|
|align=left|Albert Syomin
|align=left|Fatherland – All Russia
|
|2.71%
|-
|style="background-color:"|
|align=left|Yury Kukushkin
|align=left|Liberal Democratic Party
|
|1.94%
|-
|style="background-color:"|
|align=left|Valery Churlyaev
|align=left|Independent
|
|1.43%
|-
|style="background-color:"|
|align=left|Nikolay Koloskov
|align=left|Independent
|
|0.96%
|-
|style="background-color:#000000"|
|colspan=2 |against all
|
|8.09%
|-
| colspan="5" style="background-color:#E9E9E9;"|
|- style="font-weight:bold"
| colspan="3" style="text-align:left;" | Total
| 
| 100%
|-
| colspan="5" style="background-color:#E9E9E9;"|
|- style="font-weight:bold"
| colspan="4" |Source:
|
|}

2003

|-
! colspan=2 style="background-color:#E9E9E9;text-align:left;vertical-align:top;" |Candidate
! style="background-color:#E9E9E9;text-align:left;vertical-align:top;" |Party
! style="background-color:#E9E9E9;text-align:right;" |Votes
! style="background-color:#E9E9E9;text-align:right;" |%
|-
|style="background-color:"|
|align=left|Dmitry Rogozin (incumbent)
|align=left|Rodina
|
|78.88%
|-
|style="background-color:"|
|align=left|Vladimir Sinitsyn
|align=left|Communist Party
|
|6.91%
|-
|style="background-color:#7C73CC"|
|align=left|Yury Matveev
|align=left|Great Russia–Eurasian Union
|
|2.62%
|-
|style="background-color:"|
|align=left|Valery Yevseev
|align=left|Liberal Democratic Party
|
|2.05%
|-
|style="background-color:#1042A5"|
|align=left|Konstantin Ashifin
|align=left|Union of Right Forces
|
|1.01%
|-
|style="background-color:"|
|align=left|Sergey Kazbanov
|align=left|Independent
|
|0.63%
|-
|style="background-color:#164C8C"|
|align=left|Aleksey Safonov
|align=left|United Russian Party Rus'
|
|0.50%
|-
|style="background-color:#000000"|
|colspan=2 |against all
|
|5.83%
|-
| colspan="5" style="background-color:#E9E9E9;"|
|- style="font-weight:bold"
| colspan="3" style="text-align:left;" | Total
| 
| 100%
|-
| colspan="5" style="background-color:#E9E9E9;"|
|- style="font-weight:bold"
| colspan="4" |Source:
|
|}

2016

|-
! colspan=2 style="background-color:#E9E9E9;text-align:left;vertical-align:top;" |Candidate
! style="background-color:#E9E9E9;text-align:left;vertical-align:top;" |Party
! style="background-color:#E9E9E9;text-align:right;" |Votes
! style="background-color:#E9E9E9;text-align:right;" |%
|-
|style="background-color: " |
|align=left|Aleksey Zhuravlyov
|align=left|Rodina
|105,531
|44.95%
|-
|style="background-color: " |
|align=left|Sergey Rudakov
|align=left|Communist Party
|52,142
|22.21%
|-
|style="background-color: " |
|align=left|Oleg Burtsev
|align=left|Liberal Democratic Party
|21,053
|8.97%
|-
|style="background-color: " |
|align=left|Roman Khartsyzov
|align=left|A Just Russia
|15,345
|6.54%
|-
|style="background: "| 
|align=left|Valentina Bobrova
|align=left|The Greens
|9,941
|4.23%
|-
|style="background:"|
|align=left|Ilya Gullov
|align=left|Communists of Russia
|7,998
|3.41%
|-
|style="background:"|
|align=left|Andrey Sviridov
|align=left|Party of Growth
|4,551
|1.94%
|-
|style="background-color: " |
|align=left|Vladislav Khodakovsky
|align=left|People's Freedom Party
|4,128
|1.76%
|-
|style="background-color: " |
|align=left|Ivan Kamenev
|align=left|Patriots of Russia
|3,545
|1.51%
|-
|style="background-color:#00A650" |
|align=left|Aleksey Kovtun
|align=left|Civilian Power
|2,802
|1.19%
|-
| colspan="5" style="background-color:#E9E9E9;"|
|- style="font-weight:bold"
| colspan="3" style="text-align:left;" | Total
| 227,036
| 100%
|-
| colspan="5" style="background-color:#E9E9E9;"|
|- style="font-weight:bold"
| colspan="4" |Source:
|
|}

2021

|-
! colspan=2 style="background-color:#E9E9E9;text-align:left;vertical-align:top;" |Candidate
! style="background-color:#E9E9E9;text-align:left;vertical-align:top;" |Party
! style="background-color:#E9E9E9;text-align:right;" |Votes
! style="background-color:#E9E9E9;text-align:right;" |%
|-
|style="background-color: " |
|align=left|Andrey Markov
|align=left|United Russia
|104,892
|46.82%
|-
|style="background-color: " |
|align=left|Aleksandr Shabunin
|align=left|Communist Party
|32,280
|14.41%
|-
|style="background-color: " |
|align=left|Artem Rymar
|align=left|A Just Russia — For Truth
|18,961
|8.46%
|-
|style="background-color: " |
|align=left|Andrey Chekurin
|align=left|New People
|18,175
|8.11%
|-
|style="background: "|
|align=left|Aleksey Zolototrubov
|align=left|Communists of Russia
|17,591
|7.85%
|-
|style="background-color: " |
|align=left|Vyachelsav Vladmirov
|align=left|Rodina
|13,272
|5.92%
|-
|style="background-color: " |
|align=left|Aleksandr Ovsyannikov
|align=left|Liberal Democratic Party
|11,099
|4.95%
|-
| colspan="5" style="background-color:#E9E9E9;"|
|- style="font-weight:bold"
| colspan="3" style="text-align:left;" | Total
| 224,050
| 100%
|-
| colspan="5" style="background-color:#E9E9E9;"|
|- style="font-weight:bold"
| colspan="4" |Source:
|
|}

Sources
89. Аннинский одномандатный избирательный округ

References

References

Russian legislative constituencies
Politics of Voronezh Oblast